Khetsuriani is a surname. Notable people with the surname include:

Irma Khetsuriani, Georgian wheelchair fencer
John Khetsuriani (born 1951), Georgian lawyer
Dato Khetsuriani, Georgian weightlifter, gold medallist in 2017 Junior World Weightlifting Championships